Motilal is an Indian given name. It may refer to:

Motilal Banarsidass, an Indian publishing house on Sanskrit and Indology since 1903
Motilal Nehru (1861– 1931), activist of the Indian National Movement, leader of the Indian National Congress, and patriarch of the Nehru-Gandhi family
Motilal Rajvansh (1910–1965), film actor 
Motilal Vora (born 1928), member of the Indian National Congress, former chief minister of Madhya Pradesh, and former governor of Uttar Pradesh